Bolivar Free Library is a historic Carnegie library building located at Bolivar in Allegany County, New York. It is one of 3,000 such libraries constructed between 1885 and 1919. Carnegie provided $5,000 toward the construction of the Bolivar Free Library.

It was listed on the National Register of Historic Places in 2003.

References

External links
Bolivar Free Library

Library buildings completed in 1911
Libraries on the National Register of Historic Places in New York (state)
Buildings and structures in Allegany County, New York
1911 establishments in New York (state)
National Register of Historic Places in Allegany County, New York